The 2022 IIHF World Championship Division IV was an international ice hockey tournament organised by the International Ice Hockey Federation.

The tournament was held in Bishkek, Kyrgyzstan from 3 to 8 March 2022.

This was the first edition of the Division IV tournament, which had been cancelled the previous two years.

Kyrgyzstan won the tournament, earning promotion to Division III Group B for 2023. Iran, Singapore and Malaysia were also promoted with Kuwait continuing to participate in Division IV.

Participants

Match officials
Two referees and five linesmen were selected for the tournament.

Standings

Results
All times are local (UTC+6)

Statistics

Scoring leaders
List shows the top skaters sorted by points, then goals.

GP = Games played; G = Goals; A = Assists; Pts = Points; +/− = Plus-minus; PIM = Penalties In Minutes
Source: IIHF.com

Goaltending leaders
Only the top five goaltenders, based on save percentage, who have played at least 40% of their team's minutes, are included in this list.

TOI = Time On Ice (minutes:seconds); GA = Goals against; GAA = Goals against average; Sv% = Save percentage; SO = Shutouts
Source: IIHF.com

Awards

References

External links
 Official website

2022
Division IV
2022 in Kyrgyzstani sport
International ice hockey competitions hosted by Kyrgyzstan
March 2022 sports events in Asia
Sport in Bishkek